George Washington Rains (1817 – March 21, 1898) was a United States Army and later Confederate States Army officer. A skilled engineer and inventor; he was instrumental in providing the Confederacy with much-needed gunpowder throughout the American Civil War. He also was the younger brother of fellow Confederate general Gabriel J. Rains.

Biography
Rains was born in Craven County in North Carolina in 1817. He graduated from the United States Military Academy at West Point in 1842 as third out of a class of 56; being commissioned a 2nd Lieutenant in the Corps of Engineers. In the next year he transferred to the 4th U.S. Artillery Regiment and then became an assistant professor of chemistry, mineralogy, and geology back at West Point. He participated in the Mexican–American War, fighting at Vera Cruz, Cerro Gordo, Contreras, Churubusco, Molino del Rey and Chapultepec. For his services he was promoted to 1st Lieutenant and brevetted Captain. Over the next years he frequently changed stations and often served on recruiting duty. The full Captain's promotion came in February 1856 when he was stationed in New York but he resigned his commission half a year later.

Rains became a proprietor of the Washington & Highland Iron Works in Newburgh, New York and became a patent holding engineer for steam engines and boilers. He also married local Frances Josephine Ramsell (1838–1919) with whom he'd have a daughter, Fanny Powell Rains.

When the American Civil War began Rains joined the Confederate army. George Rains became a major in the Ordnance Department and was tasked to procure, and prospect for, gunpowder ingredients and to initiate the production. His work did much for the establishment of Gen. Isaac M. St. John's Bureau of Nitre and Mining, to which he transferred, in 1862. Being promoted to lieutenant colonel, he went to Augusta, Georgia and established the Confederate Powderworks at the Augusta Arsenal. Inspired by, and learning from, British material, his methods and inventions provided for comparably safe and efficient production. At its peak the powderworks regularly produced about  a day, more than  throughout the war, making it the second-largest gunpowder factory in the world at that time. Rains was promoted to colonel on July 12, 1863. Rains also commanded the local defense regiment and led it during Sherman's March to the Sea.

Shortly before the war ended he additionally received command of the ordnance depots and arsenals in the lower Confederacy. Apparently in 1865 he had been made a brigadier general in the Georgia Militia, too, though he also kept his Confederate rank. His older brother Gabriel J. Rains was a West Point absolvent of 1827 and served as Confederate brigadier general as well. The older Rains had specialized in the creation and use of mines, booby traps and torpedoes; and headed the Torpedo Bureau. Though not working together the brothers were collectively known as Bomb Brothers while George Rains on his own had been called the Chief Chemist of the Confederacy.

After the war Rains stayed in Augusta and chose an academic life; he lectured as professor of chemistry at the Medical College of Georgia. Also becoming its dean, he retired in 1894 and returned to Newburgh. He died there on March 21, 1898, and was buried at Saint George's Cemetery.

As of June 2021, historian and publisher Theodore P. Savas of Savas Beatie was in the final writing stage of what promises to be a definitive biography of George W. Rains. It will include an in-depth examination of his early years, his extensive Mexican War service, his interwar years, a detailed discussion of his role during the Civil War based extensively on primary and heretofore unused documents, and a chapter on his postwar life.

Selected works by George W. Rains

US Patent No. 28.011 (Re-issue No. 1016); Improved Feed-Water Apparatus for Steam Boilers; 1860
US Patent No. 32.204; Improvement in Steam-Boilers; 1861
US Patent No. 32.532; Improved Safety Apparatus for Steam Boilers; 1861

See also

List of American Civil War generals (Acting Confederate)
 Confederate Powderworks
 Bureau of Nitre and Mining

Notes

References
 Eicher, John H., and David J. Eicher, Civil War High Commands. Stanford: Stanford University Press, 2001. .
 
 
 
 Chip Bragg, Theodore P. Savas, et al. Never For Want of Powder: The Confederate Powder Works at Augusta, Georgia. University of South Carolina Press, 2007. .

External links

 

1817 births
1898 deaths
American military personnel of the Mexican–American War
Confederate militia generals
Confederate States Army officers
People from Craven County, North Carolina
United States Army officers
United States Military Academy alumni
19th-century American educators
Burials in New York (state)